Fahrettin Akbaş (1927 – 2 May 1994) was a Turkish wrestler. He competed in the men's Greco-Roman flyweight at the 1952 Summer Olympics.

References

External links
 

1927 births
1994 deaths
Turkish male sport wrestlers
Olympic wrestlers of Turkey
Wrestlers at the 1952 Summer Olympics
Sportspeople from Konya